Actia autumnalis is a species of tachinid flies in the genus Actia of the family Tachinidae.

Distribution
Ontario to New Brunswick, to Missouri and North Carolina.

References

Diptera of North America
autumnalis
Insects described in 1917